Derek Shizuo Tatsuno (born 1958) is a former baseball pitcher.

College career
Tatsuno attended the University of Hawaii at Manoa from 1977 to 1979 where he amassed an impressive record in collegiate baseball as a pitcher.

While in college he became the first 20-game winner in a season (in 22 starts) and threw 234 strikeouts (both national records).

Professional career
Tatsuno was selected in the 2nd round of the regular phase of the June 1979 draft by the San Diego Padres. However, he signed a reported one million dollar contract to play in Japan. He was selected in the 2nd round of the January 1980 secondary phase by the Chicago White Sox, and in the 1st round of the January 1982 regular phase by the Milwaukee Brewers.

Tatsuno never played in the majors. In  he played for the Brewers' AA affiliate, the El Paso Diablos of the Texas League, going 7–2 with a 6.42 ERA and walking more than a batter an inning. In  he was demoted to the Single-A Stockton Ports of the California League, going 10–6, 3.24, but Milwaukee released him. After not pitching the two previous years, Tatsuno resurfaced briefly with the Hawaii Islanders of the Pacific Coast League, the  Triple-A affiliate of the Pittsburgh Pirates and  Triple-A affiliate of the Chicago White Sox. In 1986 he posted a 5.52 era in 29.1 innings over 11 games. In 1987 his marks raised to a 6.60 era in 43.2 innings over 22 games.

Awards and honors
 Tatsuno was selected to the All-Time All-Star Team of Collegiate Baseball America.
 UH Manoa Baseball retired his number, 16, in 1997.
 On July 4, 2007, Tatsuno was inducted into the College Baseball Hall of Fame.

External links

1958 births
American baseball players of Japanese descent
Baseball pitchers
Baseball players from Hawaii
National College Baseball Hall of Fame inductees
El Paso Diablos players
Hawaii Islanders players
Hawaii Rainbow Warriors baseball players
Living people
Stockton Ports players
All-American college baseball players